Cristóvão Ferreira (c. 1580–1650) was a Portuguese Catholic priest and Jesuit missionary who committed apostasy after being captured and tortured during the anti-Christian purges in 17th-century Japan. During the Tokugawa shogunate, Christian missionaries and their Japanese followers were persecuted, arrested and executed. Authorities were concerned that the religion was making followers loyal to Christian nations rather than the Emperor or the Shogunate.

After Ferreira had renounced his faith, he remained in Japan for the rest of his life. He became known as one of the "fallen priests" who assisted Japanese authorities with their knowledge of Western philosophies and sciences.

Early life and career
Born around 1580, in Torres Vedras, Portugal, Ferreira was sent to Asia, where he was a missionary from 1609 to 1633 in Japan, which was then ruled by the Tokugawa shogunate.

Apostate
In 1633, Ferreira was captured and renounced Christianity after being tortured for five hours. He became the most famous of the "fallen priests" and changed his name to Sawano Chūan (Japanese: 沢野忠庵). He registered at a Buddhist temple in accordance with Japanese law, and called himself "a member of the Zen sect", but his own publications attest that he adopted a philosophy of natural law:
Hubert Cieslik writes:

Life after apostasy
After his apostasy he married a Japanese woman and wrote several books, including treatises on Western astronomy and medicine, which became widely distributed in the Edo period. He also is alleged to have privately written a book on religion entitled 「顕偽録」 (The Deception Revealed) in 1636, but it was not published for 300 years and there is some controversy concerning who wrote it. He participated in government trials of other captured Jesuits. He was often present during the use of fumi-e, whereby suspected Christians were ordered to trample on an image of Jesus Christ.

Death
He died in Nagasaki in 1650.<ref>Henrique Leitão (2000). "Reseña de 'La Supercherie Dévoilée. Une Réfutation du Catholicisme au Japon au XVIIe Siécle' de Jacques Proust,"  Bulletin of Portuguese / Japanese Studies, December, Año/Vol 1, Universidade Nova de Lisboa. Lisboa, Portugal, 131-134</ref> Some reports claim that, just before his death he recanted, was tortured and died as a martyr, while other reports merely note that he died.

 In popular culture
Shusaku Endo's novel Silence is set in the aftermath of Ferreira's apostasy.
Ferreira is played by Tetsurō Tamba in the 1971 film version and by Liam Neeson in the 2016 film version.
In the 1996 Portuguese drama film Os Olhos da Ásia, João Perry plays Ferreira.

See also
Ruben Habito
List of converts to Buddhism from Christianity
List of Westerners who visited Japan before 1868

 References 

 Further reading 
 George Elison (1988). Deus destroyed: the image of Christianity in early modern Japan.
  (2004). . Tokyo: , p. 50. 
 La Supercherie dévoilée. Une Réfutation du Catholicisme au Japon au XVIIe Siècle, annotated by Jacques Proust, Paris, éditions Chandeigne, 2013. 
 Daniello Bartoli, Istoria della Compagnia di Gesù, Il Giappone'' (1660), V, 12, "Apostasia del Ferreira, suo ravvedimento, e morte"

External links
 The Christian Century in Japan, by Charles Boxer
 The case of Christóvão Ferreira, by Hubert Cieslik

1580 births
1650 deaths
Portuguese expatriates in Japan
Portuguese torture victims
Former Jesuits
17th-century Portuguese Jesuits
Converts to Buddhism from Roman Catholicism
Portuguese Roman Catholic missionaries
Portuguese Buddhists
People from Torres Vedras
Jesuit missionaries in Japan